Laredo is an American Western television series that aired on NBC from 1965–67, starring Neville Brand, William Smith, Peter Brown, and Philip Carey as Texas Rangers. It is set on the Mexican border around Laredo in Webb County in South Texas. The program presented 56 episodes in color. It was produced by Universal Television. The series has a comedic element, but like another NBC series that premiered in 1965, The Wackiest Ship in the Army, it was an hour in length, had no laugh track, and characters were not infrequently killed in it, thus going against three unofficial rules for sitcoms at the time.

The pilot episode of Laredo aired on NBC's The Virginian under the title, "We've Lost a Train" (April 21, 1965; season three, episode 30). In 1969, the pilot was released theatrically under the title Backtrack. Three episodes from the first season of the series were edited into the 1968 feature film Three Guns for Texas.

Synopsis
Laredo combines action and humor with the focus on three fictional Texas Rangers. Ranger Reese Bennett (Brand) is older than his two partners, Chad Cooper (Brown) and Joe Riley (Smith). Reese was previously an officer of the Union Army during the American Civil War. Originally from New Orleans, Chad was in the Border Patrol during the war, and joined the Rangers to search for gunrunners who had ambushed fellow border patrolmen. Joe was a gunfighter, who was at times on the wrong side of the law.  He joined the Rangers to obtain protection from a sheriff. Chad and Joe tease Reese about his "advanced" age; he was in his 40s.

The three Rangers are led by the stern and disciplined Captain Edward Parmalee (Carey). The character of Ranger Erik Hunter (Robert Wolders) joined the others in the second season, while Ranger Cotton Buckmeister (Claude Akins) worked with Reese and the others in five episodes.

Peter Brown recalled that the producers of the show wanted the three stars to have the same relationship and camaraderie as did the stars of Gunga Din, and had Brand, Brown, and Smith watch the film three times.

Cast

Main cast

Guest cast

Episodes

Season one: 1965–66

Season two: 1966–67

Selected episodes

In "The Would-Be Gentleman of Laredo", with Donnelly Rhodes as Don Carlos, three swindlers use Reese Bennett as a dupe in a land-fraud scheme by which they claim ownership of most of Laredo.

In "Meanwhile Back at the Reservation", Joe Riley comes across Grey Smoke, an Indian boy portrayed by then 14-year-old Kurt Russell, who has been working for an outlaw gang. Joe and Chad take Grey under their wings, and the boy proves helpful when gunslingers try to occupy Laredo.

"The Calico Kid" focuses on a character used 11 years earlier in the syndicated Western series Buffalo Bill, Jr. In the Laredo version, the Kid is Sam Lowell, who has matured into a respected citizen of the fictional town of Guarded Wells, Texas. Chad and Joe try to help Lowell continue the deception of his true identity. Meanwhile, a businessman plots to steal gold bullion from the bank while the citizenry is distracted.

In "The Golden Trail", Jeanette Nolan is cast as Ma Burns, who investigates the progress of a gold shipment that Reese Bennett is supposedly transporting from St. Louis to Laredo. Jim Davis appears in this episode as a sheriff. Nolan also appeared as Martha Tuforth in "It's the End of the Road, Stanley" (1966) and as Vita Rose in "Like One of the Family" (1967).

Lane Bradford was cast five times in different roles, as Three-finger Jake in "Rendezvous at Arillo" and as Amos Slaughter in "Which Way Did They Go?" (both 1965), as Ben Slick in "The Treasure of San Diablo" and as Charley Smith in "Road to San Remo" (both 1966), and as Lyle in "Walk Softly" (1967).

DVD releases
Timeless Media Group released the entire series on DVD in Region 1 on November 24, 2009.  The 12-disc boxed set features all 56 episodes of the series, as well as bonus features.

References

External links

1965 American television series debuts
1967 American television series endings
NBC original programming
English-language television shows
1960s Western (genre) television series
Television series about the Texas Ranger Division
Television series by Universal Television
Television shows set in Texas
American television spin-offs
Fictional characters of the Texas Ranger Division